The following is a list of notable people from Washington state. It includes people who were born, raised, or who live(d) in the U.S. state of Washington, along with those who are strongly associated/have significant relations with the state.

A

 Nathan Adrian (born 1988) (Bremerton), competitive swimmer, five-time Olympic gold medalist
 Sandy Alderson (born 1947) (Seattle), baseball general manager, New York Mets
 Sherman Alexie (born 1966) (Wellpinit), writer, poet, and filmmaker 
 Laura Allen (born 1974) (Bainbridge Island), actress, The 4400, Dirt, Awake
 Paul Allen (1953–2018) (Seattle), entrepreneur and philanthropist; co-founder, Microsoft
 Rick Anderson (born 1956) (Everett), baseball pitching coach,
 Earl Anthony (1938–2001) (Tacoma), professional bowler
 Brad Arnsberg (born 1963) (Seattle), baseball pitching coach, Houston Astros
 Colleen Atwood (born 1948) (Quincy), Academy Award-winning costume designer
 Earl Averill (1902–1983) (Snohomish), Major League Baseball outfielder in National Baseball Hall of Fame
 John Aylward (born 1946) (Seattle), actor; ER, The Others, Armageddon

B

 Red Badgro (1902–1998) (Kent), National Football League end; member, Pro Football Hall of Fame
 Jean-Luc Baker (born 1993), Olympic Ice Dancer
 Chris Ballew (born 1965) (Seattle), singer, alternative-rock band The Presidents of the United States of America
 Zach Banner (born 1993) (Tacoma), NFL football offensive tackle for the Pittsburgh Steelers 
 Bob Barker (born 1923) (Darrington), game show host, The Price Is Right
 Tony Barnette (born 1983) (Federal Way), relief pitcher for the Texas Rangers
 Glenn Beck (born 1964) (Mount Vernon), conservative talk radio and television host
 Welton Becket (1902–1969) (Seattle), architect 
 Caprice Benedetti (born 1966) (Seattle), actress
 Bruce Bennett (1906–2007) (Tacoma), athlete and actor
 Barbara Berjer (1920–2002) (Seattle), soap opera actress
 Steven "Jesse" Bernstein (1950–1991) (Seattle), poet, author, and essayist
 Jeff Bezos (born 1964) (Seattle), founder and CEO of Amazon
 Greg Biffle (born 1969) (Vancouver), NASCAR driver
 Josie Bissett (born 1970) (Seattle), actress
 Angie Bjorklund (born 1989) (Spokane), basketball player, Chicago Sky
 Tori Black (born 1988) (Seattle), adult model and pornographic actress
 Frances Blakemore (1906–1997), artist and author
 Sheila Bleck (born 1974) (Vancouver), IFBB professional bodybuilder
 Drew Bledsoe (born 1972) (Ellensburg), football quarterback, New England Patriots and Dallas Cowboys
 Mary L. Boas (1917–2010) (Seattle), mathematician and physics professor, and writer; author, Mathematical Methods in the Physical Sciences
 Ralph P. Boas Jr. (1912–1992) (Walla Walla), mathematician, teacher, and journal editor
 Jeremy Bonderman (born 1982) (Kennewick), baseball pitcher, Cleveland Indians
 Bill Bowerman (1911–1999) (Seattle), track coach, University of Oregon; co-founder, Nike
 Gregory "Pappy" Boyington (1912–1988) (Tacoma), Major, Marine Corps aviator, Flying Ace, Medal of Honor recipient, Navy Cross recipient
 Avery Bradley (born 1990) (Tacoma), shooting guard for Detroit Pistons
 Bryan Braman (born 1987) (Spokane), linebacker, Philadelphia Eagles
 Jesse Brand (born 1976) (Ferndale), singer-songwriter
 Michael Brantley (born 1987) (Bellevue), outfielder for Houston Astros
 Karan Brar (born 1999) (Redmond), actor
 Walter Houser Brattain (1902–1987) (Tonasket), Nobel Prize-winning physicist who co-invented the transistor
 Richard Brautigan (1935–1984) (Tacoma), novelist, poet, and short story writer
 Isaac Brock (born 1975) (Issaquah), singer, indie rock band Modest Mouse
 Jon Brockman (born 1987) (Snohomish), power forward for Milwaukee Bucks
 Gail Brodsky (born 1991), tennis player
 Arthur C. Brooks (born 1964) (Spokane), social scientist, economist, president of American Enterprise Institute
 Brandon Brown (born 1989), basketball player for Hapoel Jerusalem of the Israeli Basketball Premier League
 Angela Warnick Buchdahl (born 1972), rabbi
 Linda B. Buck (born 1947) (Seattle), scientist, Nobel Prize winner
 Travis Buck (born 1983) (Richland), Major League Baseball player for Houston Astros (OF)
 Ted Bundy (1946–1989) (Tacoma/Seattle), serial killer
 Billy Burke (born 1966) (Bellingham), actor, Charlie Swan in The Twilight Saga
 Nate Burleson (born 1981) (Renton), wide receiver for NFL's Detroit Lions
 Jeff Burlingame (born 1971) (Aberdeen), author, winner of NAACP Image Award and Sigma Delta Chi Award
 George Washington Bush (1779–1863) (Tumwater), pioneer
 Raegan Butcher (Snohomish), poet
 Octavia E. Butler (1947–2006) (Lake Forest Park), science-fiction writer
 Sarah Butler (born 1985) (Puyallup), actress

C

 Tom Cable (born 1964) (Snohomish), assistant coach, Seattle Seahawks
 Dove Cameron (born 1996) (Seattle), actress
 Dyan Cannon (born 1937) (Tacoma), actress
 Jerry Cantrell (born 1966) (Tacoma), guitarist for Alice in Chains
 Maria Cantwell (born 1958) (Edmonds), United States Senator, former VP of RealNetworks
 Bryan Caraway (born 1984) (Yakima), mixed martial artist
 Orson Scott Card (born 1951) (Richland), author and professor at Southern Virginia University
 Harvey Carignan (born 1927), serial killer
 Brandi Carlile (born 1981) (Ravensdale), musician
 Chester Carlson (1906–1968) (Seattle), inventor of xerography
 JoAnne Carner (born 1939) (Kirkland), Hall of Fame golfer
 Raymond Carver (1938–1988) (Port Angeles), author
 Neko Case (born 1970) (Tacoma), chanteuse
 Pat Cashman (Seattle), actor and radio personality
 James Caviezel (born 1968) (Mount Vernon), actor
 Ron Cey (born 1948) (Tacoma), All-Star Major League Baseball player
 Drew Chadwick (born 1992) (Sequim), appeared on The X Factor USA with trio Emblem3
 Edward Chamberlin (1899–1967) (La Conner), economist 
 Carol Channing (1921–2019) (Seattle), actress
 Valentina Chepiga (born 1962) (Seattle), IFBB professional bodybuilder
 Dale Chihuly (born 1941) (Tacoma), glass artist
 Chin Gee Hee (1844–1929) (Seattle), Chinese immigrant, made fortune in Seattle, returned to China as railway entrepreneur
 Louis Chirillo (born 1961) (Seattle), voice actor
 Jori Chisholm (born 1975) (Seattle), champion bagpiper
 Erika Christensen (born 1982) (Seattle), actress
 Adam Cimber (born 1990) (Puyallup), pitcher for the Cleveland Indians
 Michael Clarke (1946–1993) (Spokane), drummer for The Byrds
 Beverly Cleary (1916–2021) (Yakima), author
 Chuck Close (born 1940) (Monroe), artist
 Kurt Cobain (1967–1994) (Aberdeen), Nirvana vocalist and guitarist
 Erik Coleman (born 1982) (Spokane), football player for Atlanta Falcons
 Nancy Coleman (1912–2000) (Everett), actress
 Judy Collins (born 1939) (Seattle), folk singer
 Charles Congdon (1909–1965) (Blaine), professional golfer
 Hank Conger (born 1988) (Federal Way), catcher for Houston Astros
 Jeff Conine (born 1966) (Tacoma), former All-Star Major League Baseball player
 John Considine (1868–1943) (Seattle), impresario; founded one of first vaudeville circuits
 Chris Cornell (1964–2017) (Seattle), vocalist for Soundgarden and Audioslave
 Lucy Covington (1910–1982) (Nespelem), Native American tribal leader and political activist
 Fred Couples (born 1959) (Seattle), professional golfer
 Randy Couture (born 1963) (Everett), mixed martial artist, Greco-Roman wrestler, actor
 Colin Cowherd (born 1962) (Bay Center), sports media personality
 Bruce P. Crandall (born 1933), U.S. Army officer, Medal of Honor recipient
 Ian Crawford (born 1988) (Auburn), affiliated with bands Panic! at the Disco and The Cab
 Jamal Crawford (born 1980) (Seattle), NBA player for Los Angeles Clippers
 Bing Crosby (1903–1977) (Tacoma), singer and actor
 Bob Crosby (1913–1993) (Spokane), singer and actor
 Sarah Crouch (born 1989) (Hockinson), long-distance runner
 Merce Cunningham (1919–2009) (Centralia), dancer and choreographer
 Anthony Curcio a.k.a. D.B. Tuber (born 1980), armored car robber 
 Colin Curtis (born 1985) (Issaquah), left fielder for New York Yankees

D

 Joel Dahmen (born 1987) (Clarkston), professional golfer
 Bryan Danielson (born  1981) (Aberdeen), professional wrestler
 David DeCastro (born 1990) (Kirkland), guard for NFL's Pittsburgh Steelers
 Arthur Denny (1822–1889), early pioneer who founded Seattle
 Gail Devers (born 1966) (Seattle), athlete, Olympic gold medalist
 Garret Dillahunt (born 1964) (Selah), actor
 Corey Dillon (born 1974) (Federal Way), running back for NFL's New England Patriots
 Westley Allan Dodd (1961–1993) (Toppenish), serial killer
 Elinor Donahue (born 1937) (Tacoma), actress on Father Knows Best
 James Doohan (1920–2005) (Redmond), actor, Scotty on Star Trek
 Jon Dorenbos (born 1980) (Woodinville), long snapper for NFL's Philadelphia Eagles
 Ryan Doumit (Moses Lake), outfielder for Minnesota Twins
 Howard Duff (1913–1990) (Bremerton), actor
 Jessie Duff (Burlington), competitive shooter
 Bonnie Dunbar (born 1949) (Sunnyside), astronaut
 Jeff Dye (Kent), stand-up comedian, socialite

E

 Turk Edwards (1907–1973) (Douglas County), Hall of Fame offensive tackle and coach
 John Ehrlichman (1925–1999) (Tacoma), counsel to President Richard Nixon
 Ben Eisenhardt (born 1990), American-Israeli professional basketball player in the Israeli Basketball Premier League
 Lisa Ellis (born 1982) (Woodinville), professional mixed martial artist
 Harris Ellsworth (1899–1986) (Hoquiam), Oregon congressman
 John Elway (born 1960) (Port Angeles), NFL quarterback, two-time Super Bowl winner, Denver Broncos executive
 Justin Ena (born 1978) (Shelton), NFL linebacker for Philadelphia Eagles
 Helga Estby (1860–1942) (Spokane), walked across U.S. in 1896

F

 Anna Faris (born 1976) (Edmonds), actress, starred in Scary Movie series and Just Friends
 Frances Farmer (1914–1970) (Seattle), actress
 Joe Feddersen (born 1953) (Omak), sculptor, painter, photographer
 Ray Flaherty (1903–1994) (Spokane), football player, coach, Hall of Famer
 Tom Foley (1929–2013) (Spokane), Speaker of the United States House of Representatives (1989–1995)
 Russ Francis (born 1953) (Seattle), tight end with New England Patriots and San Francisco 49ers
 Bryan Fuller (born 1969) (Clarkston), writer, creator of Dead Like Me and Pushing Daisies
 Stacy Marie Fuson (born 1978) (Tacoma), Playboy model, February 1999 Playmate of the Month

G

 Kenny G (born Kenneth Gorelick, 1956) (Seattle), musician
 Abdul Gaddy (born 1992), basketball player in the Israeli Basketball Premier League
 Tess Gallagher (born 1943) (Port Angeles), poet, essayist, writer
 Nathan Gamble (born 1998) (Tacoma), child actor, The Dark Knight, Marley & Me, Hank
 Myles Gaskin (born 1997) (Lynnwood), running back, Miami Dolphins
 Bill Gates (born 1955) (Seattle), founder of Microsoft
 Ben Gibbard (born 1976) (Bremerton), lead singer of Death Cab for Cutie and The Postal Service
 Andy Gibson (born 1981) (Spokane), country music singer
 Cam Gigandet (born 1982) (Tacoma), actor
 Garrett Grayson (born 1991) (Vancouver), quarterback, New Orleans Saints
 Vernon Greene (1908–1965) (Battle Ground), cartoonist
 Kaye (Hall) Greff (born 1951) (Tacoma), competitive swimmer, two-time Olympic gold medalist
 David Guterson (born 1956) (Bainbridge Island), author

H

 Richard Haag (1923–2018) (Seattle), landscape architect, only two-time recipient of ASLA President's Award for Design Excellence
 Nick Hagadone (born 1986) (Sumner), pitcher for the Cleveland Indians
 Ivar Haglund (1905–1985) (Seattle), folk singer, restaurateur
 Matt Hague (born 1985) (Bellevue), first baseman, Toronto Blue Jays
 Marcus Hahnemann (born 1972) (Kent), goalkeeper for Reading F.C.
 Jason Hammel (born 1982) (Port Orchard), starting pitcher, Kansas City Royals
 Thomas Hampson (born 1955) (Spokane), opera singer
 Jane Hamsher (born 1959) (Seattle), film producer, author, and left-wing blogger
 Jason Hanson (born 1970) (Spokane), placekicker, Detroit Lions
 Nick Harmer (born 1975) (Puyallup), bass guitarist for Death Cab for Cutie
 Joe Harris (born 1992) (Chelan), NBA player
 Melissa Harris-Perry (born 1973) (Seattle), author, TV host, commentator
 Spencer Hawes (born 1988) (Seattle), NBA player
 Phil Heath (Seattle), IFBB Pro, 3X Mr. Olympia
 Mel Hein (1909–1992) (Burlington), Hall of Fame player for New York Giants
 Johnny Hekker (born 1990) (Redmond), punter, Los Angeles Rams
 Mark Hendrickson (born 1974) (Mount Vernon), relief pitcher, Baltimore Orioles
 Jimi Hendrix (1942–1970) (Seattle), guitarist
 Rachelle Henry (born 2000) (Richland), actress
 Frank Herbert (1920–1986) (Tacoma), author of Dune novels
 Sue Herera (born 1957) (Spokane), CNBC reporter and anchor
 Josh Heytvelt (born 1986) (Clarkston), professional basketball player
 Steven Hill (1922–2016) (Seattle), actor, Mission Impossible and Law & Order
 Megan Hilty (born 1981) (Bellevue), actress
 Gordon Hirabayashi (1918–2012) (Auburn), sociologist
 Amy Holmes (born 1973) (Seattle), news anchor, TheBlaze TV
 Joe Ronnie Hooper (1938–1979), soldier, Medal of Honor recipient
 John Hopcroft (born 1939) (Seattle), theoretical computer scientist
 Peter Horton (born 1953) (Bellevue), actor and television director; starred in Thirtysomething
 Ray Horton (born 1960) (Tacoma), NFL cornerback; defensive backs coach for the Pittsburgh Steelers
 Kei Hosogai (born 1984) (Seattle), actor and musician
 Roy Huggins (1914–2002) (Littell), creator of television series The Fugitive and The Rockford Files
 Yolanda Hughes-Heying (born 1963) (Bellingham), IFBB professional bodybuilder
 Fred Hutchinson (1919–1964) (Seattle), Major League Baseball player and manager of Cincinnati Reds

I

 Travis Ishikawa (born 1983) (Seattle), first baseman for the San Francisco Giants
 Lucie Fulton Isaacs (1841-1916) (Walla Walla), writer, philanthropist, suffragist
 Burl Ives (1909–1995) (Anacortes), Academy Award-winning actor and folk singer

J

 Henry M. Jackson (1912–1983) (Everett), U.S. Senator, presidential candidate
 Jonathan Jackson (born 1982), actor.
 J. A. Jance (born 1944), author of mystery and horror novels
 Noname Jane (born 1977) (Aberdeen), pornographic actress
 Megan (Quann) Jendrick (born 1984) (Tacoma), competitive swimmer, two-time Olympic gold medalist, State of Washington Sports Hall of Fame inductee
 Keith Hunter Jesperson (born 1955) (Selah), serial killer
 Sally Jewell (born 1956) (Renton), 51st U.S. Secretary of Interior
 Robert Joffrey (1930–1988) (Seattle), choreographer
 Denis Johnson (1949–2017), writer of Jesus' Son
 Jason Johnson (born 1979), former Canadian Football League player
 Matt Johnson (born 1989) (Olympia), safety, Dallas Cowboys
 Russell Johnson (1924–2014) (Bainbridge Island), actor ("The Professor" on Gilligan's Island)
 Chuck Jones (1912–2002) (Spokane), animator
 Gary Lee Jones (born in Washington in 1946), member of Louisiana Board of Elementary and Secondary Education from Alexandria, Louisiana
 Quincy Jones (born 1933) (Seattle), composer, conductor, musician

K

 Kasey Kahne (born 1980) (Enumclaw), NASCAR driver
 Bianca Kajlich (born 1977) (Seattle), actress, Jennifer on CBS sitcom Rules of Engagement
 Richard Karn (born 1956) (Seattle), actor, Home Improvement, Family Feud
 Chris Kattan (born 1970) (Bainbridge Island), actor and comedian, Saturday Night Live, The Middle
 Carol Kaye (born 1935) (Everett), musician
 Jermaine Kearse (born 1990) (Lakewood), wide receiver, Seattle Seahawks
 John Keister (born 1956) (Seattle), comedian
 Keone Kela (born 1993) (Seattle), relief pitcher for Texas Rangers
 Senio Kelemete (born 1990) (Seattle), offensive guard, New Orleans Saints
 Mick Kelleher (born 1947) (Seattle), MLB infielder and coach
 Kasey Keller (born 1969) (Olympia), soccer goalkeeper for Seattle Sounders FC, formerly with Team USA
 Kitty Kelley (born 1942) (Spokane), journalist and author of several best-selling unauthorized biographies
 Donald M. Kendall (1921–2020) (Sequim), chief executive officer, PepsiCo (1971–1986)
 Brian Kendrick (born 1979) (Olympia), WWE wrestler
 Myles Kennedy (born 1969) Lead vocalist of Alter Bridge, From Spokane, Washington 
 Shiloh Keo (born 1987) (Bothell), safety for Denver Broncos
 Hank Ketcham (1920–2001) (Seattle), cartoonist, creator of Dennis the Menace
 Edward Kienholz (1927–1994) (Fairfield), artist
 Sam Kinison (1953–1992) (Yakima), comedian
 Dale Kinkade (1933–2004) (Hartline), linguist and professor
 Justin Kirk (born 1969) (Union), actor, Weeds, Jack & Jill
 Ed Kirkpatrick (1944–2010) (Spokane), Major League Baseball player
 Jon Kitna (born 1972) (Tacoma), NFL quarterback
 Kitsap, Suquamish leader
 John Kitzhaber (born 1947) (Colfax), Oregon governor (1995–2003)
 Mariana Klaveno (born 1979) (Endicott), actress, True Blood
 Amanda Knox (born 1987) (Seattle), university student accused of murdering Meredith Kercher in Perugia, Italy
 Michael Koenen (born 1982) (Ferndale), punter for the Tampa Bay Buccaneers
 Max Komar (born 1987) (Lakewood), wide receiver for Chicago Bears
 Richard Kovacevich (born 1943) (Tacoma), chief executive officer, Wells Fargo
 Cooper Kupp (born 1993) (Yakima), NFL wide receiver

L

 Jake Lamb (born 1990) (Seattle), third baseman for the Arizona Diamondbacks
 Amber Lancaster (born 1980) (Tacoma), actress, model, The Hard Times of RJ Berger, The Price is Right
 Craig Lancaster (born 1970) (Lakewood), sportswriter, novelist
 Bertha Knight Landes (1868–1943), Seattle mayor, first female mayor of major U.S. city
 Mark Lanegan (born 1964) (Ellensburg), singer-songwriter Erik Larsen (born 1962) (Bellingham), comic book writer, artist and publisher
 Rick Larsen (born 1965) (Arlington), U.S. Representative
 Gary Larson (born 1950) (Tacoma), cartoonist, creator of The Far Side
 Richard Lathim (born 1955) (Tri-Cities [Pasco, Richland, Kennewick]), politician, sheriff of Franklin County
 Michael Leavitt (artist) (born 1977) (Seattle), visual artist, sculptor and toy maker
 Brandon Lee (1965–1993), actor, son of Bruce Lee
 Gypsy Rose Lee (1911–1970) (Seattle), entertainer, subject of musical Gypsy
 Cassidy Lehrman (born 1992) (Seattle), actress, Sarah Gold on Entourage
 Leschi (1808–1858), Nisqually chief
 Jon Lester (born 1984) (Tacoma), starting pitcher for Chicago Cubs
 Blake Lewis (born 1981) (Redmond), singer and beatboxer, American Idol runner-up
 Rommie Lewis (born 1982) (Seattle), relief pitcher, Toronto Blue Jays
 Ryan Lewis (born 1988) (Spokane), producer, musician, video director
 Brent Lillibridge (born 1983) (Everett), utility player for New York Yankees
 Tim Lincecum (born 1984) (Bellevue), MLB pitcher, 2008 National League Cy Young winner
 Mary Livingstone (1905–1983) (Seattle), comedian, wife of Jack Benny
 Gary Locke (born 1950) (Seattle), Governor of Washington; U.S. Secretary of Commerce; U.S. Ambassador to China
 Jake Locker (born 1988) (Ferndale), quarterback for Tennessee Titans
 Kenny Loggins (born 1948) (Everett), singer-songwriter
 Travis Long (born 1991) (Spokane), outside linebacker for Philadelphia Eagles
 Sam Longoria (born 1956) (Seattle), producer, visual effects engineer
 Dane Looker (born 1976) (Puyallup), wide receiver, St. Louis Rams

M

 Betty MacDonald (1908–1958), children's author
 Macklemore (Seattle) (born Ben Haggerty, 1983), Northwest hip-hop singer
 Kyle MacLachlan (Yakima) (born 1959), actor, Desperate Housewives, Twin Peaks, Sex and the City
 Warren Magnuson (1905–1989), six-term US Senator and Dean of the United States Senate (1979–1981)
 Nina Makino (born 2005) (Seattle), singer and member of NiziU
 Sanjaya Malakar (born 1989) (Federal Way), singer, American Idol finalist
 Mary Mapes (Burlington), former 60 Minutes producer fired for 2004 Killian documents scandal
 Charlie Marinkovich (born 1959) (Seattle), singer-songwriter, guitarist for Iron Butterfly
 Bristol Marunde (born 1982) (Sequim), mixed martial artist
 Dave Matthews (born 1967) (resides in Seattle), singer-songwriter
 James Mattis (born 1950) (Pullman), U.S. Secretary of Defense
 Trevor May (born 1989) (Kelso), relief pitcher, Minnesota Twins
 Doc Maynard (1808–1873), founding father of Seattle
 Taylor Mays (born 1988), NFL football player
 Kevin McCarthy (1914–2010) (Seattle), actor
 Mary McCarthy (1912–1989) (Seattle), author
 Mike McCready (born 1966) (Seattle), Pearl Jam guitarist
 Bear McCreary (born 1979), composer for film, television, video games
 Darren McGavin (1922–2006) (Spokane), actor, A Christmas Story, Kolchak, The Natural
 Rose McGowan (born 1973), actress, Paige Matthews on Charmed; attended high school in Seattle
 Joel McHale (born 1971), actor, comedian; attended high school in Seattle
 John McIntire (1907–1991) (Spokane), actor, Wagon Train
 Duff McKagan (born 1964) (Seattle), Velvet Revolver, Guns N' Roses bassist
 Bonnie McKee (born 1985) (raised in Seattle), singer-songwriter
 Patricia McPherson (born 1954), actress, Knight Rider
 Santiago Villalba Mederos (born 1991), murderer and former FBI most wanted fugitive
 Jack Medica (1914–1985) (Seattle), competitive swimmer, Olympic gold medalist, nine-time NCAA champion
 Marjie Millar (1931–1966) (Tacoma), actress, About Mrs. Leslie, Money from Home
 Angie Miller (born 1994), singer, American Idol runner-up
 Roy Miller (born 1987) (Fort Lewis), defensive tackle for Jacksonville Jaguars
 Martin Milner (1931–2015) (Seattle), actor, Adam-12, Route 66, The Swiss Family Robinson
 Gary Miranda (born 1939), poet
 Beau Mirchoff (born 1989), actor, MTV's Awkward
 Patrick Monahan (born 1969), lead singer for band Train
 Jeff Monson, mixed martial artist, UFC fighter
 Jeffrey Dean Morgan (born 1966) (Seattle), actor, Watchmen, Grey's Anatomy, Magic City
 Mark Morris (born 1956) (Seattle), dancer and choreographer
 Adam Morrison (born 1984) (raised in Spokane), professional basketball player
 Robert Motherwell (1915–1991) (Aberdeen), abstract expressionist painter
 Dejounte Murray (born 1996) (Seattle), professional basketball player
 Patty Murray (born 1950) (Bothell), U.S. Senator
 Edward R. Murrow (1908–1965) CBS News correspondent; attended high school in Edison and Washington State University
 PZ Myers (born 1957) (Kent), scientist, professor University of Minnesota Morris
 Randy Myers (born 1962) (Vancouver), MLB four-time All-Star relief pitcher

 Ross Mathews (born 1979) (Mount Vernon), Television personality
 Lil Mosey (born 2002) (Mountlake Terrace), rapper

N

 Craig T. Nelson (born 1944) (Spokane), actor, The Incredibles, Coach, Parenthood
 Billy North (born 1948) (Seattle), former Major League Baseball player
 Krist Novoselic (born 1965), Nirvana bassist

 Bill Nye (born 1955), Bill Nye the Science Guy

O

 Pat O'Day (1934–2020), KJR radio disc jockey, considered godfather of Seattle rock music scene
 Eric O'Flaherty (born 1985) (Walla Walla), pitcher, Oakland Athletics
 Apolo Anton Ohno (born 1982) (Seattle), Olympic speed skater
 Danny O'Keefe (born 1943) (Spokane), musician
 John Olerud (born 1968) (Seattle), Major League Baseball first baseman
 Deanna Oliver (born 1952) (Spokane), actress, Toaster from The Brave Little Toaster and its sequels
 Gregg Olsen (born 1959) (Seattle), true crime author
 Tyler Olson (born 1989) (Spokane), Major League Baseball pitcher
 Henry O'Malley (1876–1936), United States Commissioner of Fish and Fisheries
 Robert Osborne (1932–2017) (Colfax), film historian, TV personality
 Roger "Buzz" Osborne (born 1964) (Morton), guitarist, vocalist and songwriter, founder of Melvins, Fantômas and Venomous Concept
 Lyle Overbay (born 1977) (Centralia), MLB first baseman
 Logan Owen (born 1995) (Bremerton), professional cyclist, Cannondale–Drapac
 Seena Owen (1894–1966) (Spokane), actress, Queen Kelly, Victory

P

 Janis Paige (born 1922) (Tacoma), actress
 Chuck Palahniuk (born 1962) (Pasco), novelist and freelance journalist
 Jaebeom Park (born 1987), member of Korean music group 2PM
 J. P. Patches (born Chris Wedes; 1928–2013), clown; hosted one of the longest-running locally produced children's program in U.S. history
 Robin Pecknold (born 1986), musician
 Janice Pennington (born 1942), model, The Price is Right 
 Jay Pickett (1961–2021) (Spokane), actor, Port Charles, General Hospital
 Mark Pigott (born 1954), chairman and chief executive officer, Paccar
 Chris Pratt (born 1979) (raised in Lake Stevens), actor, Everwood, Parks and Recreation
 Megyn Price (born 1971) (Seattle), actress
 Cory Procter (born 1982) (Gig Harbor), guard for Miami Dolphins
 Dorothy Provine (born 1935 in Deadwood, South Dakota, died in Bremerton, Washington, 2010), singer, actress, attended University of Washington
 Henry Prusoff (1912–1943) (Seattle), tennis player;  # 8 in singles in the U.S. in 1940

R

 Benji Radach (born 1979) (Castle Rock), professional mixed martial artist
 Ella Raines (1920–1988) (Snoqualmie Falls), actress
 Ford Rainey (Centralia), actor
 Blair Rasmussen (born 1962) (Auburn), basketball player, Denver Nuggets
 John Ratzenberger (born 1947, built a house on Vashon Island as a summer home in the 1990s), Cliff Clavin on Cheers
 Pamela Reed (born 1949) (Tacoma), actress
 Dave Reichert (born 1950) (raised in Kent), Congressman, law enforcement officer
 Ann Reinking (1949–2020) (Seattle), actress, dancer, choreographer
 Jason Repko (born 1980) (Richland), outfielder for Minnesota Twins
 John Requa (born 1967) (raised in Burien), screenwriter, Cats & Dogs and Bad Santa
 Roger Revelle (1909–1991) (Seattle), scientist, pioneer of global warming studies
 Don Rich (1941–1974) (Olympia), guitarist, singer with Buck Owens
 Davey Richards (born 1983), professional wrestler
 Gary Ridgway (born 1949), serial killer
 Luke Ridnour (born 1982), point guard for Minnesota Timberwolves; attended high school in Blaine
 Theodore Rinaldo (Snohomish) (1944–2000), convicted child sex offender
 James Robart (born 1947) (Seattle), federal judge
 Tom Robbins (born 1932), best-selling novelist, worked for The Seattle Times
 Howard P. Robertson (1903–1961) (Hoquiam), cosmologist
 Laurent Robinson (born 1985) (Fort Lewis), wide receiver for Dallas Cowboys
 Nate Robinson (born 1984) (Seattle), guard for Golden State Warriors
 Jimmie Rodgers (1933–2021) (Camas), pop singer
 Jarred Rome (Marysville), Olympic discus thrower, bodybuilder
 Emily Rose (born 1981), actress, ER, Brothers & Sisters, John from Cincinnati
 Brandon Roy (born 1984) (Seattle), shooting guard for Portland Trail Blazers
 Kathryn Ruemmler (born 1971) (Richland), White House Counsel to President Barack Obama
 Ann Rule (1931–2015), true-crime author; attended University of Washington; worked with the Seattle Police Department
 Merrilee Rush (born Merrilee Gunst, 1944) (Seattle), singer, "Angel of the Morning"
 Gerri Russell (born 1962), romantic fiction author
 Rick Rydell (born 1963) (Seattle), radio talk show host, author, outdoors writer
 Mark Rypien (born 1962) (raised in Spokane), quarterback for Washington Redskins, MVP of Super Bowl XXVI, philanthropist

S

Sa–Sm

 Ryne Sandberg (born 1959) (Spokane), MLB player and manager, member of Baseball Hall of Fame
 Larry Sanger (born 1968), Wikipedia co-founder
 Ron Santo (1940–2010) (Seattle), third baseman and radio broadcaster for Chicago Cubs; member of Baseball Hall of Fame
 Robert (Bob) Satiacum (1929–1991), Puyallup tribal leader, American Indian activist
 Dan Savage (born 1964), writer of advice column Savage Love and editor of Seattle weekly The Stranger
 Brian Scalabrine (born 1978) (raised in Enumclaw), professional basketball player
 Ivyann Schwan (born 1983), child actress, Parenthood, Problem Child 2
 Dick Scobee (1939–1986), astronaut, commander of Space Shuttle Challenger
 Seattle (c. 1786–1866), Duwamish/Suquamish leader and diplomat
 Daniel Seavey (born 1999) (Vancouver), singer-songwriter, contestant American Idol season 14
 Kyle Secor (born 1957) (Tacoma), actor
 Derek Sheen, stand-up comedian
 Danny Shelton (born 1993) (Auburn), defensive tackle for New England Patriots
 Robert Shields (1918–2007) (Dayton), minister and teacher who wrote a 37.5-million-word diary, possibly the longest ever written
 Roger Shimomura (born 1939) (Seattle), artist, professor at University of Kansas
 Tre Simmons (born 1982) (Seattle), professional basketball player
 Sir Mix-a-Lot (born Anthony Ray, 1963), hip-hop artist
 Doug Sisk (born 1957) (Renton), MLB pitcher
 Grady Sizemore (born 1982) (Seattle), MLB player, three-time All-Star, Silver Slugger award winner
 Tom Skerritt (born 1933), actor; lives in Lake Washington
 Alex Smith (born 1984) (Seattle), quarterback for Kansas City Chiefs
 Jeff Smith (1939–2004) (Seattle), food expert, television personality
 Shawn Smith (1956–2019), rock musician
 Smohalla (c. 1851–1895), Sahaptin spiritual leader

Sn–Sz

 Blake Snell (born 1992) (Seattle), starting pitcher for the Tampa Bay Rays
 Tom Sneva (born 1948) (Spokane), 1983 Indy 500 champion, 2-time USAC champion
 Travis Snider (born 1988) (Everett), MLB outfielder
 Quin Snyder (born 1966) (Mercer Island), head coach of NBA's Utah Jazz
Tim Soares (born 1997), American-Brazilian basketball player for Ironi Ness Ziona of the Israeli Basketball Premier League
 Hope Solo (born 1981) (Richland), goalkeeper for United States women's national soccer team
 Steven Souza (born 1989) (Everett), outfielder for Arizona Diamondbacks
 Jack Owen Spillman (Spokane) (born 1960), serial killer, "Werewolf Butcher"
 Layne Staley (1967–2002), vocalist for Alice in Chains
 Isaiah Stanback (Seattle) (born 1984), wide receiver on New York Giants
 Lyn Stanley, born in Tacoma, jazz singer since 2013
 Rick Steves (born 1955) (Edmonds), authority on European travel
 Jonathan Stewart (born 1987) (Fort Lewis), running back for New York Giants
 Ryan Stiles (born 1959) (Seattle), actor, comedian, The Drew Carey Show, Whose Line Is It Anyway?, Two and a Half Men
 Robert Stock (born 1989), MLB baseball player
 John Stockton (born 1962) (Spokane), Hall of Fame player for NBA's Utah Jazz
 Mel Stottlemyre (1941–2019), pitcher and coach for New York Yankees; lives in Issaquah
 Keaton Stromberg (born July 16, 1996) (Sequim), appeared on The X Factor USA with trio Emblem3
 Wesley Stromberg (born December 6, 1994) (Sequim), appeared on The X Factor USA with trio Emblem3
 Robert Stroud (1890–1963) (Seattle), convict, "Birdman of Alcatraz"
 Rodney Stuckey (born 1986), NBA player
 Michael Swango (born 1954), physician, serial killer
 Julia Sweeney (born 1959) (Spokane), actress, comedian, Saturday Night Live
 Gloria Wilson Swisher (born 1935) (Seattle), composer and educator

T

 Miesha Tate (born 1986) (Tacoma), UFC mixed martial artist
 Chrissy Teigen (born 1985) (Snohomish), Sports Illustrated model
 Daniel Te'o-Nesheim (born 1987), NFL defensive end; lived in Mill Creek
 Jason Terry (born 1977) (Seattle), NBA player for Milwaukee Bucks
 Kim Thayil (born 1960), guitarist for grunge band Soundgarden
 Isaiah Thomas (born 1989) (Tacoma), point guard for Los Angeles Lakers
 Brian Thompson (born 1959) (Ellensburg), actor'
 Cappy Thompson (born 1952), glass artist
 Nick Thune (born 1979) (Seattle), actor, comedian, and musician
 Earl Torgeson (1924–1990) (Snohomish), Major League Baseball player
 Rachel Trachtenburg (born 1993), drummer, singer of Trachtenburg Family Slideshow Players
 Desmond Trufant (born 1990), NFL cornerback for Atlanta Falcons
 George Tsutakawa (1910–1997) (Seattle), sculptor and painter
 Ann Tyrrell (1909–1983) (Whatcom County), actress, Private Secretary and The Ann Sothern Show

U

 Blair Underwood (born 1964) (Tacoma), actor, L.A. Law, The New Adventures of Old Christine, Ironside
 Misty Upham (born 1982) (Auburn), actress
 Brian Urlacher (born 1978) (born in Pasco, but raised in New Mexico), linebacker for the Chicago Bears

V

 Greg "The Hammer" Valentine (born 1951) (Seattle), professional wrestler
 Courtney Vandersloot (born 1989) (Kent), player with WNBA's Chicago Sky
 Eddie Vedder (born 1964), vocalist for Pearl Jam; lived in Seattle
 Austin Voth (born 1992) (Redmond), relief pitcher for the Washington Nationals

W

 Chris Walla (born 1975) (Bothell), guitarist for Death Cab for Cutie
 Jessica Wallenfels, actress, choreographer, and movement/theatre director
 Maiara Walsh (born 1988), actress, singer, Ana Solis on Desperate Housewives and Meena Paroom on Cory in the House
 Bryan Walters (born 1987), wide receiver for San Diego Chargers
 Jennifer Warnes (born 1947) (Seattle), singer
 Martell Webster (born 1986), NBA player, Minnesota Timberwolves
 Zoe Weizenbaum (born 1991) (Seattle), actor
 Adam West (1928–2017) (Seattle), actor; played Batman on TV series (1966–1968)
 Myles White (born 1990) (Tacoma), wide receiver for New York Giants
 Sammy White (1928–1991) (Wenatchee), Major League Baseball player
 Sean White (born 1981) (Pullman), relief pitcher for Boston Red Sox
 Bernie Whitebear (born Bernard Reyes; 1937–2000), American Indian activist
 Christopher Wiehl (born 1970) (Yakima), actor
 Lis Wiehl (born 1961), legal analyst for Fox News; author
 Michael Winslow (Spokane) (born 1958), actor and comedian; Cadet Jones in Police Academy films
 Marcus Williams (born 1986) (Seattle), NBA player
 Marvin Williams (born 1986) (Bremerton), NBA player for Charlotte Hornets
 Terrence Williams (born 1987) (Seattle), NBA player for Houston Rockets
 Ann (born 1950) and Nancy Wilson (born 1954), members of Heart; lived in Bellevue
 Rainn Wilson (born 1968) (Seattle), actor, The Office

Y

 Takuji Yamashita (1874–1952), early 20th-century civil-rights pioneer
 Robert Lee Yates (born 1952) (Spokane), serial killer
 DeAndre Yedlin (born 1993), soccer player
 Henry Yesler (Seattle), entrepreneur; considered to be one of Seattle's founding fathers
 Katrina Young (born 1992) (Shoreline), two time Olympic platform diver
 Chika Yoshida (born 1984) (Anacortes), YouTuber

Z

 Constance Zimmer (born 1970) (Seattle), actress, Entourage, Boston Legal, House of Cards

See also

By educational institution affiliation

 List of Cornish College of the Arts people
 List of The Evergreen State College people
 List of University of Washington people

By governmental office

 List of attorneys general of Washington
 List of governors of Washington
 List of justices of the Washington Supreme Court
 List of United States representatives from Washington
 List of United States senators from Washington

By location

 List of people from Bellingham, Washington
 List of people from Everett, Washington
 List of people from Olympia, Washington
 List of people from Seattle
 List of people from Spokane, Washington
 List of people from Vancouver, Washington

References

Lists of people from Washington (state)